The 1991 Philadelphia mayoral election saw the election of Democrat Ed Rendell.

Democratic primary

Candidates

Declared
 Lucien Blackwell, City Councilman and  Consumers Party nominee for Mayor in 1979
 George R. Burrell, Jr., City Councilman
 Peter Hearn, former Chancellor of the Philadelphia Bar Association
 Ed Rendell, former District Attorney of Philadelphia and candidate for Mayor in 1987

Results

Republican primary

Candidates

Declared
 Ronald Castille, Philadelphia District Attorney
 Sam Katz, municipal finance expert
 Frank Rizzo, former Mayor

Withdrew
 Joan Specter, City Councilwoman (to run for re-election)
 Dennis Morrison-Wesley, tax consultant (to run as New Philadelphia candidate)

Declined
 Thacher Longstreth, nominee for Mayor in 1955 and 1971
 Brian J. O'Neill, City Councilman

Results

Following Rizzo's death, City Council candidate Joseph Egan was selected by the Philadelphia Republican Party to replace Rizzo as the nominee.

Independents and third parties

Consumer
 Pamela Lawler

New Alliance
 Willie Dennis-Scott

New Philadelphia
 Dennis Morrison-Wesley, tax consultant

Socialist Workers
 Kathleen Mickells, coal miner and nominee for Vice President of the United States in 1988

General election

Results

References

Philadelphia
1990s in Philadelphia
1991 Pennsylvania elections
1991